George Fleming Warren, 2nd Baron de Tabley PC (28 October 1811 – 19 October 1887) was a British Liberal politician. He notably served as Treasurer of the Household under William Ewart Gladstone between 1868 and 1872.

Background
Born George Fleming Leicester, he was the eldest son of John Leicester, 1st Baron de Tabley, by his wife Georgina Maria Cottin, daughter of Josiah Cottin. A godson of George IV, he was educated at Eton and Christ Church, Oxford. In 1832 he assumed by Royal licence the surname of Warren in lieu of Leicester under the terms of the will of his kinswoman Elizabeth Warren-Bulkeley (née Warren), Viscountess Bulkeley.

Political career
Lord de Tabley succeeded in the barony on the death of his father in 1827. He sat on the Liberal benches in the House of Lords and served under successively Lord Aberdeen, Lord Palmerston and Lord Russell as a Lord-in-waiting (government whip in the House of Lords) between 1853 and 1858 and 1859 and 1866. In 1868 he was appointed Treasurer of the Household in the first Liberal administration of William Ewart Gladstone, a post he held until 1872, and was sworn of the Privy Council in 1869.

Family

Lord de Tabley married Catharina Barbara 'Nina', daughter of Jerome, 4th Count de Salis-Soglio, in 1832. They had two sons and four daughters:

John Byrne Leicester Warren, 3rd Baron de Tabley (1835–1895).
Hon. Catharine Leicester (1838–1881). Buried Harlington, Middlesex, beside her mother. In 1884 the women's ward of the Harlington, Harmondsworth and Cranford Cottage Hospital was named after her.
Hon. Meriel Warren (1839–72), married Allen Bathurst in 1862.
Hon. Eleanor (1841-14 August 1914), married Sir Baldwyn Leighton, 8th Baronet (1836-2 January 1897), of Loton, Shropshire, in 1864. She was (eventual) heir to her brother in 1895, and in 1900 took the name Leighton-Warren. Barbara Sotheby (1870–1952), photographer and painter, was her daughter.
Hon. Francis Peter Leicester Warren (1842–1845).
Hon. Margaret Warren (1847–1921), married Arthur Cowell-Stepney, 2nd Baronet (aka Emile Algernon Arthur Keppel Cowell-Stepney) (1834–1909), of Llanelli, in 1875. Their daughter Catherine Muriel Cowell-Stepney (Miss Alcyone Stepney) (1876–1952), was painted by Sir John Everett Millais. She married Sir Stafford Howard in 1911.

Lady de Tabley died in 1869. Lord de Tabley subsequently married Elizabeth Smith-Barry (née Jacson) in 1871, but had no further children. He died in October 1887, aged 75, to be succeeded in his titles by his eldest and only surviving son, John.

Gallery

References

External links

tableyhouse.co.uk

1811 births
1887 deaths
Barons in the Peerage of the United Kingdom
People educated at Eton College
Alumni of Christ Church, Oxford
Treasurers of the Household
Liberal Party (UK) Lords-in-Waiting
Members of the Privy Council of the United Kingdom
Eldest sons of British hereditary barons
Hulme Trust